Young Blood is a 1932 American pre-Code Western film directed by Phil Rosen and starring Bob Steele, Helen Foster, and Charles King. It was released on November 5, 1932.

Cast list
 Bob Steele as Nick, "The Kid"
 Helen Foster as Gail Winters
 Charles King as Sheriff Jake Sharpe
 Neoma Judge as Lola Montaine
 Harry Semels as Tony Murullo
 Henry Roquemore as Beckworth
 Henry Hall as the Mayor
 Hank Bell as the Deputy sheriff
 Art Mix as Ed
 Perry Murdock as Hank

References

External links 
 
 
 

1932 films
1932 Western (genre) films
American Western (genre) films
American black-and-white films
Films directed by Phil Rosen
1930s American films